Acylita distincta  is a species of moth of the family Noctuidae first described by E. Dukinfield Jones in 1908. It is found in Brazil. Its wingspan is about 26 mm.

Description
Head and thorax brownish ochreous; pectus and hindlegs whitish, fore and mid legs and hind tarsi at extremity fuscous brown; abdomen white tinged with ochreous and slightly irrorated (sprinkled) with fuscous. Forewing brownish ochreous sparsely irrorated with black; black points in middle of cell and on discocellulars; slight fuscous points above and below submedian fold just beyond middle; a faint, diffused oblique fuscous streak from apex to just beyond discoidal point and a diffused oblique subtertninal line from below apex to submedian fold; a terminal series of black points. Hindwing white suffused with ochreous except on inner area; cilia white; the underside white, the costal area suffused with ochreous and slightly irrorated with brown.

References

Hadeninae
Moths of South America
Moths described in 1908